The Mathematisch-Physikalischer Salon (Royal Cabinet of Mathematical and Physical Instruments) in Dresden, Germany, is a museum of historic clocks and scientific instruments. Its holdings include terrestrial and celestial globes, astronomical, optical and geodetic devices dating back to the 16th century, as well as historic instruments for calculating and drawing length, mass, temperature and air pressure.  

The Mathematisch-Physikalischer Salon is part of the Staatliche Kunstsammlungen Dresden (State Art Collections). It is located in the Zwinger.

Today's presentation 

After a general reconstruction of the Zwinger, the museum has been reopened April 14, 2013. The new exhibition presents about 500 historical scientific instruments. They are shown in four chapters.
 The Cosmos of the Prince: Mechanical marvels and mathematical instruments from around 1600.
 The Universe of Globes: Terrestrial and celestial globes from seven centuries.
 Instruments of the Enlightenment: Collection of large telescopes and burning mirrors, the salon in the 18th century.
 The Course of Time: Clocks, watches, and automata since the renaissance.

References and notes

External links

Mathematisch-Physikalischer Salon at Staatliche Kunstsammlungen Dresden
Mathematisch-Physikalischer Salon within Google Arts & Culture

Horological museums in Germany
Staatliche Kunstsammlungen Dresden
Museums established in 1724
Libraries established in 1556
1556 establishments in the Holy Roman Empire
1724 establishments in the Holy Roman Empire